Return Fire 2 is a computer game developed by Silent Software and published for Windows by Ripcord Games in 1998. It is a sequel to Return Fire.

Gameplay
The game simulates a vehicle-based capture the flag competition.

Upon starting the game players are directed to their in game bunker. There, they can view the battleground with a radar and access a limited supply of vehicles: tanks, armored support vehicles (ASVs), helicopters, jets, jeeps and PT boats. The vehicles have a limited supply of fuel and ammo, and the player can only control one vehicle at a time.

The objective is to enter the enemy's base, capture their flag and bring it back to the player's base. The flag is always located in a 'flag tower', which must be destroyed before the flag can be picked up. There may be more than one enemy flag tower, but only one of them contains the flag. Although the flag may be discovered using any vehicle it can only be carried by the jeep, which is the weakest vehicle in the game. Thus, the player must destroy the enemy flag's defenses using stronger vehicles before attempting to take it.

The game retains the classical soundtrack of its predecessor, with each vehicle having its own 'theme' which is heard when the player is using that vehicle.

Development
The game was showcased at E3 1997. It was originally scheduled to release in late 1997 by MGM Interactive. It was initially announced for the Panasonic M2 console, which was aborted in mid-1997, forcing M2 to developers to either convert their M2 projects to other platforms or cancel them. Towards the end of development it was announced that Return Fire 2 would instead be released for the PC and PlayStation, but ultimately only the PC version was released.

Reception

The game received favorable to average reviews.

Notes

References

External links
 

1998 video games
Cancelled Panasonic M2 games
Cancelled PlayStation (console) games
Helicopter video games
Multiplayer and single-player video games
North America-exclusive video games
Ripcord Games games
Strategy video games
Tank simulation video games
Vehicular combat games
Video games developed in the United States
Windows games
Windows-only games
Silent Software games